The Pyongyang–Wonsan Tourist Motorway is a  in North Korea that connects the cities of Pyongyang, the capital of the country, and Wonsan, a city on the coast of the Sea of Japan in the province of Kangwon. The expressway opened in 1978. The highway became North Korea's first toll road in 2018.

Images

References

Roads in North Korea